Pergamon is an ancient Greek city in modern Turkey. Pergamon may also refer to:

Places
 Pergamon Museum, a museum in Berlin housing artifacts from Pergamon and elsewhere
 Pergamon Altar, a structure from the city now housed in the museum

Art, entertainment, and media
 Pergamon (album), an album by Tangerine Dream
 Pergamon World Atlas, a Polish atlas

Other uses
 Pergamon Press, a publishing house

See also
 Attalid dynasty
 Bergama, the modern Turkish city
 Pergamus